The 1930 Miami Redskins football team was an American football team that represented Miami University as a member of the Buckeye Athletic Association (BAA) during the 1930 college football season. In its seventh season under head coach Chester Pittser, Miami compiled a 4–4–1 record (1–3 against conference opponents) and finished in fourth place out of five teams in the BAA.

Schedule

References

Miami
Miami RedHawks football seasons
Miami Redskins football